Régine Hantelle better known by her stage name Anaïs (born 1 March 1961 in Paris, France) is a French singer. 

In 1988, she formed a duo with her twin sister Alice as Alice et Anaïs had a successful single "A deux". In 1991, she released her first solo album "L'étudiante" that included the track "Le temps est long" (a duet with Alice), as well as "L'amour avec toi", "J't'en veux" and "Rêves des lunes" as singles.

She is known for her many collaborations with Didier Barbelivien, her companion as Anaïs et Didier Barbelivien. Their album "Vendée '93" sold 2 million copies and saw release of singles "Les Mariés de Vendée" in 1992 and "Quitter l'autoroute" in 1993).

Discography

Albums
Solo
L'étudiante (1991)

as Anaïs et Didier Barbelivien
Vendée 93 (1992)
Quitter l'autoroute (1994)

Singles
as Alice et Anaïs
 "A Deux" (1988)

Solo
"Le temps est long" (as duet with Alice)
"L'amour avec toi" (cover of song by Michel Polnareff)
"J't'en veux"
"Rêves des lunes"
"Au cœur de septembre" (cover of song by Nana Mouskouri)

as Anaïs et Didier Barbelivien

Other songs with Didier Barbelivien

"Te rejoindre en Vendée"
"Les gens qui chantent"
"Notre enfance"
"Les moulins de mon cœur" (cover of song by Michel Legrand)
"Un garçon nommé Jésus"
"La valse à l'envers"
"Les ailes d'un Whiter Shade of Pale"
"Toujours par la main"
"Les merveilleux nuages"

References

External links
Discogs

French women singers
1965 births
Living people
Singers from Paris